Sirotrema is a genus of fungi in the family Tremellaceae. The genus has a widespread distribution in north temperate regions, and contains three species.

References

External links

Tremellomycetes